People's Tamil Congress is an unregistered extraparliamentary Sri Lankan political party led by L. P. Shanmuganathan. In the 2005 presidential election the party supported Mahinda Rajapaksa but in the 2010 election the supported the opposition candidate Sarath Fonseka. In the April 2010 parliamentary election People's Tamil Congress participated as a part of General Fonseka's Democratic National Alliance. Party leader Shanmuganathan was candidate in Colombo Electoral District but neither he nor any party member was elected.

Tamil political parties in Sri Lanka
Political parties in Sri Lanka